Marie-Françoise-Adélaïde Gavaudan, called Mlle Gavaudan cadette and nicknamed Spinette, (1767–1805) was a French operatic soprano.

Life 

In 1780, she was hired with her sister Émilie, by Madame Donvilliers, of the Petits Comédiens de .

She was a chorister in 1778, at the Académie royale de musique. She already sang important roles, such as that of Angélique in the revival of Roland by Piccinni in October 1782. On 8 July 1782, she made her debut at the Comédie-Italienne, as Mme Saintclair, in La Fausse Magie by Gretry; then as Alix, in Les Trois fermiers de Dezède; as Aline, in la Belle Arsène, but she was not hired by this company.

She was coryphée in 1784, at the Académie Royale de Musique. She became an assistant in 1786. She came to prominence in 1787 with the role of Spinette in Tarare by Salieri, she retained the sobriquet of "Spinette" During the Revolution, she fled Paris for Germany, then returned. In 1793, she remained at the Opéra; as a singing artist, attached to this company at least until 1798.

In 1796, she joined the troupe of the Théâtre Feydeau, where she created Ziméo (Martini, 1800). In 1802, when Feydeau's troupe was combined with that of the Opéra-Comique, she retired from the stage and emigrated to Hamburg.

Creations 
At the Académie royale de musique
 1781: Iphigénie en Tauride,  tragédie lyrique by Niccolò Piccinni, libretto  by Alphonse du Congé Dubreuil, 23 January, as Elise.
  1782: L'embarras des richesses, comédie lyrique in three acts, libretto by Jean-Baptiste Lourdet de Santerre, 26 November, as Phénice.
 1783: Didon, tragédie lyrique in three acts by Niccolò Piccinni, libretto by Jean-François Marmontel, 1 December
 1784: La caravane du Caire, opéra-ballet in three acts by André Grétry, libretto by Étienne Morel de Chédeville, 15 January 
 1784: Diane et Endymion, libretto by Jean-François Espic de Lirou, music by Piccini, 7 September, as l’Amour 
 1784: Chimène, tragédie lyrique française, by Antonio Sacchini, libretto by Guillard, as Elvire
 1785: Panurge dans L’Ile des Lanternes, by Grétry, libretto by Étienne Morel de Chédeville, 25 January
 1785: Pénélope , tragédie lyrique in 3 acts, libretto by Jean-François Marmontel ; music by Niccolo Piccinni, 9 December, as Minerve.
 1786: Œdipe à Colone, by Antonio Sacchini, 4 January
 1786: Phèdre, opera by Jean-Baptiste Lemoyne, libretto by François-Benoît Hoffman, 26 October, as Œnone.
 1786: Les Horaces, tragédie lyrique in 3 acts, libretto by Nicolas-François Guillard, music by Antonio Salieri, 2 December
 1787: Alcindor, opéra-féerie in 3 acts, libretto by Marc-Antoine-Jacques Rochon de Chabannes; music by Nicolas Dezède, 17 April 
 1787: Tarare, opera, music by Antonio Salieri, libretto by Pierre-Augustin Caron de Beaumarchais, 8 June, role of Spinette
 1789:  Les Prétendus de Lemoyne, libretto by Marc-Antoine-Jacques Rochon de Chabannes, 2 June
 1790: Les Pommiers et le Moulin, by Jean-Baptiste Lemoyne, 22 January

At Théâtre Feydeau
 1800: Ziméo, opéra comique in three acts, by Jean-Baptiste Lourdet de Santerre, music by Martini, 16 October
 1801: Le locataire, one act opéra comique by Pierre Gaveaux, libretto by Charles-Augustin de Bassompierre, 17 September, as Apolline.

References

Sources 
 Le Ménestrel, 
 1872: n°32, 7 July; n°33, 14 July; n°34, 21 July; n°35, 28 July; n°36, 4 August Read online.
 Arthur Pougin, Figures d’Opéra-Comique : Mme Dugazon, Elleviou, la tribu des Gavaudan, Paris, Tresse, 1875,  Archive.
 .

External links 

French operatic sopranos
1767 births
1805 deaths
Place of birth missing